There are approximately 1300 islands in Saudi Arabia. This list includes some islands of Saudi Arabia.

Location of islands

Islands on the southern coast of the Red Sea 

 Kutambil island
 Jabal Al-Sabaya (Al-Sabaya mountain)
 Umm al-Qamari islands

Farasan Island 
The Farasan Islands is a group of islands located offshore of Jizan on southwestern of Saudi Arabia. The group includes:

 Farasan al-Kabir 
 As-Saqid (Sajid)
 Ad-Dissan (Dusan) 
 Zufaf (Zifaf)
 Sasawah (Sasu)
 Qummah 
 Dumsuk (Dumsuq) 
 Manzar Abu ash-Shawk 
 Kayyirah  
 Jabal Muhammad  
 Sajid Island

Islands on the northern coast of the Red Sea 
The islands located on the Northern coast of the Red Sea include 

 Sanafir Island
 Tiran Island

 Al Nabageyah

 Al Uwandiyah
 Riykhah
 Mardunah
 Ad Dahrah
 Sheikh Marbat
 Mrumah
 Mezebeyah
 Harr
 Ber-reem
 Umm al Malek
 Jazayah
 Attaweel
 Umm Qshaiyat
 Al Munqaleb 
 Umm Khadav

 Shusha island

Islands on the eastern coast of Saudi Arabia 

 Abu Ali Island 
Tarout Island.

Persian Gulf Coral Islands 
These are six islands situated on the eastern coast of Saudi Arabia in the Persian Gulf:

 Juraid
 Jana Island
 Kurain
 Karan Island
 Arabiyah
 Harqus

References 

Islands of the Red Sea
Saudi Arabia
Islands